Lomavren is a nearly extinct mixed language spoken by the Lom people, that arose from language contact between a language related to Romani and Domari and the Armenian language.

Names
The language is also known as Bosa/Bosha.

Linguistic features
It lacks grammatical gender and has seven grammatical cases; its grammar is closely related to that of the Erzerum dialect of Armenian, with the vocabulary being almost exclusively Indic.

Numerals in the Romani, Domari and Lomavren languages, with Sanskrit, Hindi, Bengali, Persian and Sinhala forms for comparison. Also Greek and Latin included.

References 

Para-Romani
Endangered Indo-European languages
Armenian languages
Languages of Azerbaijan
Languages of Russia
Languages of Syria